This is a list of television channels available in Sindhi language. All of these are stationed in Pakistan, but are available in other countries as well.

History
Time News HD offers high definition, Sindhi content to the World.
Television in Pakistan expanded after 2002.
Private television channels were allowed during the rule of Pervez Musharraf in 2000.
Sindhi media tends to cover topics which may not be covered by Urdu or English media.
Pakistan has government owned as well as private media (including print and electronic), which is free and covers happenings in the nation and the rest of the world.

Current channels

News
 Time News 
 Awami Awaz TV
 KTN News
 Mehran TV
 Sindh TV News

Entertainment
 Awaz TV HD
 Dharti TV
 Sindh  TV

Music
 Kashish TV

Former channels

News
 BOL News Sindhi

Entertainment
 PTV Sindh
 TandoAdam TV
 Sindhi Kachchhi Tv

Music
 Sachal Music

See also
 List of Pakistani television channels
 Sindhi-language media
 List of Sindhi-language newspapers

References

Sindhi language
Television, Sindhi
Television stations in Pakistan
Sindh
Mass media in Sindh
Sindhi-language mass media